Newton of Ardtoe is a scattered crofting hamlet near Acharacle in Lochaber, Scottish Highlands and is in the council area of Highland.

Populated places in Lochaber